Barley yellow dwarf virus 5' UTR is a non-coding RNA element containing structural elements required for translation of the viral genome.

Unlike eukaryotic mRNA, this virus lacks a 5' cap and a poly(A) tail but still circularises its mRNA through base pairing between two stem loops, one located in the 5' UTR and the other within the 3' UTR. The structure within the 3' UTR has been previously characterised as the 3' cap-independent translation element (3' TE element) and the 5' UTR of barley yellow dwarf virus has been predicted to contain 4 stem loop structures. Mutagenesis showed that stem loop 4 is essential for base pairing with 3'TE and only 5 bases are needed to base pair for mRNA circularization to occur.

References

Further reading

External links 
 

Non-coding RNA
Gene expression